Musa Hadid (born 1965) is the former mayor of Ramallah, Palestine. A Palestinian civil engineer, he has been the mayor of Ramallah, a city of 40,000 people, from 2012 to 2022.

Hadid studied at Birzeit University, graduating in 1993. He worked as a civil engineer for 20 years before turning to politics.  He is a Christian.

In 2020, Hadid was the subject of an award-winning film called "Mayor", directed by filmmaker David Osit, which follows Musa Hadid's day-to-day life as mayor. The film has been called a "darkly comic saga" and "the best new film about the Israeli-Palestine conflict".

Other activities

Non-profit organizations 

 Head of the Palestinian Union of Local Authorities
 Member of the Higher Presidential Committee of Church Affairs in Palestine
 Member of the Municipal Development and Lending Fund
 Vice-chairman of the Board of Trustees of Al-Istiqlal Park
 Member of the Board of Trustees of the Mahmoud Darwish Museum
 Member of the Special Committee for the Consideration of Structuring Palestine into Development Regions
 Member of a Presidential Committee for Civil Peace.

References 

1965 births
Living people
Palestinian civil engineers
People from Ramallah
Fatah members
Birzeit University alumni
Mayors of Ramallah
Palestinian Roman Catholics